The Algerian Ligue 2, also called Ligue 2 , formerly known as Ligue Professionnelle 2 and Championnat National 2, is the second highest division overall in the Algerian football league system. Administered by the Ligue Nationale du Football Amateur, it is contested by 32 clubs, divided into two groups with the two champions of each group prmote to Ligue Professionnelle 1 and  the bottom 3 teams of each group relegate to the Inter-Régions Division. It was professional from 2010 to 2020.

History 

The league was created in 1962, when Algeria became an independent nation, and has been played in a number of different formats.

In 2010, the league became fully professional. Prior to the start of the 2010 season, the name of the league was changed to the Algerian Ligue Professionnelle 2 to reflect the professionalization of the league.

On 15 December 2011, six clubs from the league were sanctioned by the Ligue de Football Professionnel (LFP) for not responding to their set deadline (7 December 2011) in solving the disputes between their players. The following clubs were banned from recruiting any player during the winter transfer window: US Biskra, RC Kouba, MO Bejaia, CA Bordj Bou Arréridj, USM Annaba and MO Constantine. The clubs were also informed that, if the disputes are not resolved within a period of one month they would further be sanctioned with a 
deduction of points.
In the 2020-21 season, the level returned to its amateur format and were played between 36 teams in three groups of 12 teams, with play-offs between the champions of each group. The winners and the runners-up of the play-offs were promoted to the Ligue Professionnelle 1 and the bottom four teams of each group relegated to the Inter-Régions Division.
In the 2021-22 season, the format changed again, with 32 teams divided into two groups of 16. The champions of each group promote to the Ligue Professionnelle 1 and the bottom four teams of each group relegate to the Inter-Régions Division.

Clubs participating for the 2022–23 season
The following 32 clubs will compete in Ligue 2 during the 2022–23 season.

Group Centre-east
Note: Table lists in alphabetical order.

Group Centre-west
Note: Table lists in alphabetical order.

Previous seasons

Promoted teams (from Ligue 2 to Ligue 1)

Relegated teams (from Ligue 1 to Ligue 2)

Relegated teams (from Ligue 2 to the Third Division)

Promoted teams (from the Third Division to Ligue 2)

Top scorers

References

External links 
 LNFA official Website
 DZFoot.com
 Algerian Ligue 2 - Hailoosport.com (Arabic)
 Algerian Ligue 2 - Hailoosport.com 
 Algerian Ligue 2 - SOCCERWAY

 
2
Second level football leagues in Africa